The Bezirksliga Rhein was the highest association football league in the northern part of the German state of Baden and the Bavarian region of Palatinate from 1923 to 1927, when the league was replaced by the Bezirksliga Rhein-Saar.

Overview 
The league was formed in 1923, after a league reform which was decided upon in Darmstadt, Hesse. It replaced the Kreisliga Odenwald and the Kreisliga Pfalz as the highest leagues in the region.

The Bezirksliga Rhein, named after the river Rhine (German: Rhein),  started out with eight teams, playing each other in a home-and-away round with the league winner advancing to the Southern German championship, which in turn was a qualification tournament for the German championship.

The league modus remained unchanged for its first three seasons, 1923–24, 1924–25 and 1925-26. For its last edition however, it expanded to ten clubs. Additionally, the leagues runners-up also qualified for a "consolidation" round with the other runners-up of the southern Bezirksligas. The winner of this round was awarded the third entry spot for the south to the German finals.

In an attempt to bring all Southern German leagues to a similar system, the Bezirksligas were reorganised in 1927. For the Bezirksliga Rhein, this meant, it joined with the southern clubs of the Bezirksliga Rheinhessen-Saar to form the new Bezirksliga Rhein-Saar. In practice, this meant little change for the league as the new Bezirksliga was immediately sub-divided into two independent, regional divisions. Out of the ten clubs in the league, eight went to the new Bezirksliga Rhein-Saar - Rhein division, only the FK Pirmasens found itself grouped into the Saar division of the new league while the SV Darmstadt 98 went to the new Bezirksliga Main-Hessen.

National success

Southern German championship
Qualified teams and their success:
 1924:
 Waldhof Mannheim, 4th place
 1925:
 VfR Mannheim, Southern German champions
 1926:
 VfR Mannheim, 4th place
 1927:
 VfR Mannheim, 4th place Bezirksliga-runners-up round
 VfL Neckarau, 4th place

German championship
Qualified teams and their success:
 1924:
 none qualified
 1925:
 VfR Mannheim, First round
 1926:
 none qualified
 1927:
 none qualified

Founding members of the league
The league was formed from eight teams:
 Waldhof Mannheim
 VfR Mannheim
 Phönix Ludwigshafen
 FK Pirmasens
 Pfalz Ludwigshafen
 VfTuR Feudenheim
 Ludwigshafener FG
 Phönix Mannheim

Winners and runners-up of the Bezirksliga Rhein

Placings in the Bezirksliga Rhein 1923 to 1927

Source:

References

Sources
 Fussball-Jahrbuch Deutschland  (8 vol.), Tables and results of the German tier-one leagues 1919-33, publisher: DSFS
 Kicker Almanach,  The yearbook on German football from Bundesliga to Oberliga, since 1937, published by the Kicker Sports Magazine
 Süddeutschlands Fussballgeschichte in Tabellenform 1897-1988  History of Southern German football in tables, publisher & author: Ludolf Hyll

External links
 The Gauligas  Das Deutsche Fussball Archiv
 German league tables 1892-1933  Hirschi's Fussball seiten
 Germany - Championships 1902-1945 at RSSSF.com

1
1923 establishments in Germany
1927 disestablishments in Germany
Football competitions in Baden-Württemberg
Football competitions in Rhineland-Palatinate
Southern German football championship